Ramazzotti may refer to:

 Eros Ramazzotti, Italian singer
 Ramazzotti (liquor), Italian liquor